The Voice Kids is a Russian reality television singing competition broadcast on Channel One. Based on the original The Voice Kids of Holland, the concept of the series is to find currently unsigned singing talent (solo or duets, professional and amateur) contested by aspiring singers, age 6 to 15, drawn from public auditions. The winner is determined by television viewers voting by SMS text and The Voice Kids App.

The winners of the ten seasons have been: Alisa Kozhikina, Sabina Mustaeva, Danil Pluzhnikov, Elizaveta Kachurak, Rutger Garecht, 9 finalists of the sixth season, Olesya Kazachenko, Vladislav Tyukin, Adelia  Zagrebina, and Anna Dorovskaya. 

The series employs a panel of three coaches who critique the artists' performances and guide their teams of selected artists through the remainder of the season. They also compete to ensure that their act wins the competition, thus making them the winning coach. The original panel featured Dima Bilan (seasons 1–4), Pelageya (seasons 1–3, and 5–6), and Maxim Fadeev (seasons 1–2). The panel for the most recent tenth season featured Basta (seasons 5, and 7–10), MakSim (season 10―), and Egor Kreed (seasons 8―10). Other coaches include Leonid Agutin (season 3), Nyusha (season 4), Valery Meladze (seasons 4–7),  LOBODA (seasons 6 and 8) and Polina Gagarina (season 7 and 9).

The Voice Kids began airing on February 28, 2014, as a winter-spring TV season programme. The show proved to be a hit for Channel  One.

Conception
An adaptation of the Dutch show The Voice Kids, Channel One announced the show under the name Голос. Дети (The Voice Kids).

In each season, the winner receives ₽500,000 (about $8,000) and a record deal with Universal Music Group.

Selection process and format
Blind auditions
Each season begins with the "Blind Auditions," where coaches form their team of artists (15 artists in each team) whom they mentor through the remainder of the season. The coaches' chairs are faced towards the audience during artists' performances; those interested in an artist press their button, which turns their chair towards the artist and illuminates the bottom of the chair to read "Я выбираю тебя" ("I WANT YOU"). At the conclusion of the performance, an artist either defaults to the only coach who turned around or selects his or her coach if more than one coach expresses interest.
Battles
In the Battle Rounds, each coach groups three of his or her team members to perform together then chooses one to advance in the competition.
Sing-offs
In the Sing-off Rounds, five artists within a team sing individual performances in succession. The artists get to sing their "Blind Auditions" songs in this round. At the conclusion of the performances, coaches would decide which two of five artists get to advance to the next round.
Life Playoffs
But as with season 2, each coach bring back three artists who were eliminated in the Sing-offs. These artists advance to the special stage – "Live Playoffs". Three artists from each team sing live and two of them eliminate by the end of the night. One saved by the Public's vote artist advances to the Final in each team.
Final
In the Final of the competition, 6 artists from all teams (9 artists since season 2) perform in the live show, where public voting narrows to a final group of three artists from all teams and eventually declares a winner.
Addition
Since season 6, alongside the determining of the winner, television viewers vote for the Best coach using The Voice Kids App and HbbTV option in their TV sets.

Coaches and presenters

Coaches

Presenters

Series overview
Warning: the following table presents a significant amount of different colors.

  Team Dima Bilan
  Team Pelageya
  Team Maxim Fadeev
  Team Leonid Agutin

  Team Nyusha
  Team Valery Meladze
  Team Basta
  Team LOBODA

  Team Polina Gagarina
  Team Egor Kreed
  Team MakSim

Best coach

Reception

Seasons average: Ratings
The first season premiered on February 28, 2014 with an 8.6 rating in the 18-49 demographic. For its average season rating, the show was in the Top 3 at an 8.76 ranking.

The second season premiered on February 13, 2015 with an 8.6 in the 18–49 demographic. It wasn't up/down from last season's premiere.

The third season premiered on February 20, 2016 with an 8.9 in the 18-49 demographic. It was up from last season's premiere by .2 rating scores.

The fourth season premiered on February 17, 2017 with an 8.1 in the 18-49 demographic. It was down from last season's premiere by .8 rating scores.

The fifth season premiered on February 2, 2018 with a 6.7 in the 18-49 demographic. It was down from last season's premiere by 1.4 rating scores.

The sixth season premiered on February 15, 2019 with a 6.3 in the 18-49 demographic. It was down from last season's premiere by .4 rating scores.

The seventh season premiered on February 14, 2020 with a 5.3 and was viewed by 3.78 million people in the 4-49 demographic. It was down from last season's premiere by 1.0 rating scores. This is the lowest rated season premiere to date.

The eighth season will premiere in February 2021.

Each Russian network television season starts in late August and ends in late May.

Notes

References

External links
 Official website 

 
2010s Russian television series
2014 Russian television series debuts
Russian music television series
Channel One Russia original programming
Carousel (TV channel) original programming
Television series about children
Television series about teenagers